Speedy was the trade name for broadband internet services offered by Telkom Indonesia. , it offered a range of packages for download speeds between 512 kbit/s and 100Mbit/s, with some plans including additional advertising inserted by Telkom. Speedy was replaced in 2015 with the fiber-based IndiHome.

Slogans
Akses Internet Cepat (Fast Internet Access) (2004–2008)
Speed You Can Trust (2008–2010)
Lead Your Life (2010–2013)
True Broadband (2013–2015)

References

External links
  IndiHome official website

2004 establishments in Indonesia
2015 disestablishments in Indonesia
Internet service providers